Ballophilus foresti is a species of centipede in the genus Ballophilus. It is found in Benin and Ivory Coast. The male of this species has 63 pairs of legs; the female has 67 leg pairs.

References 

Ballophilidae